Noé E. (Noah) Chevrier (April 27, 1846 – October 9, 1911) was a clothier, furrier and political figure in Manitoba, Canada. He sat for Winnipeg division in the Senate of Canada from 1909 to 1911.

He was born in Rigaud, Canada East, the son of Alexandre Gauthier and Mathilde Chevrier, and was educated there. He worked in his father's clothing business in Ottawa and then, in 1881, went to Winnipeg where he established a business, Le Magasin Bleu (also known as The Blue Store), in partnership with A. Chevrier. Chevrier was married twice: to Isabella Johnston in 1880 and later to Agnes McMillan after his first wife's death in 1884.

He died in office in Ottawa at the age of 65.

His son Horace served in the Manitoba assembly.

References

Canadian senators from Manitoba
Liberal Party of Canada senators
1846 births
1911 deaths